U of N may refer to:

 University of Nebraska
 University of Nevada, Reno
 University of New Hampshire
 University of New Mexico
 University of North Carolina at Chapel Hill
 University of North Dakota
 University of the Nations

See also
 UN (disambiguation)